Arne Dahl may refer to:

Arne Dahl (politician) (1907–1974), North Dakota Commissioner of Agriculture and Labor
Arne Dagfin Dahl (1894–1990), Norwegian military officer
Jan Arnald (born 1963), Swedish crime author, pen name Arne Dahl
Arne Dahl (TV series), based on Jan Arnald's novels